{{Infobox film
| name           = A Trip to Chinatown
| image          = A Trip to Chinatown - 1926 theatrical poster.jpg
| caption        = 1926 theatrical poster
| director       = Robert P. Kerr
| producer       = William Fox
| writer         = Beatrice Van
| based_on       = {{basedon|A Trip to Chinatown|Charles Hale Hoyt}}
| starring       = Margaret LivingstonEarle FoxeJ. Farrell MacDonald
| music          =
| cinematography = Barney McGill
| editing        =
| distributor    = Fox Film
| released       = 
| runtime        = 60 minutes; 6 reels (5,594 feet)
| country        = United States
| language       = Silent (English intertitles)
| budget         =
}}A Trip to Chinatown is a 1926 American silent comedy film produced and distributed by the Fox Film Corporation and starring Margaret Livingston and Earle Foxe. The supporting cast includes Anna May Wong and Charles Farrell. The movie was scripted by Beatrice Van from Charles Hale Hoyt's hit 1891 Broadway musical of the same name and directed by Robert P. Kerr.Progressive Silent Film List: A Trip to Chinatown (1926) at silentera.com

Livingston played the "Woman from the City" the following year in F. W. Murnau's Sunrise: A Song of Two Humans, the rival to Farrell's future screen partner Janet Gaynor.

Plot
As described in a film magazine review, Welland Strong is a young man who is told by his doctor that he has but a short time to live, so he gives away all his effects and goes to San Francisco to visit his rich and lively uncle Benjamin Strong. There he has many adventures which culminate in his agreeing to marry the widow Alicia Cuyer and in his learning that the period of his life is to be greatly extended.

Cast

Preservation
With no prints of A Trip to Chinatown'' located in any film archives, it is a lost film.

See also
 1937 Fox vault fire

References

External links

 
 

1926 films
American silent feature films
American black-and-white films
Films directed by Robert P. Kerr
Fox Film films
1926 comedy films
Silent American comedy films
Lost American films
1926 lost films
Lost comedy films
1920s American films